Iryna Lyubomyrivna Shepetyuk (born 13 February 1982) is a Ukrainian sprint athlete who specializes in the 100 metres.

She was born in Kolomiya, and represents the club Dynamo Ivano-Frankivska. In the 4 x 400 metres relay she won a bronze medal at the 2007 Summer Universiade. She also competed at the 2005 World Championships without reaching the final, The Ukrainian team failed to finish the race at the 2007 World Championships, and was disqualified at the 2008 Olympic Games.

Her personal best times are 7.35 seconds in the 60 metres (indoor), achieved in February 2004 in Sumy; 11.37 seconds in the 100 metres, achieved in May 2004 in Kyiv; and 23.31 seconds in the 200 metres, achieved in July 2004 in Kyiv.

Competition record

References

1982 births
Living people
Ukrainian female sprinters
Athletes (track and field) at the 2008 Summer Olympics
Olympic athletes of Ukraine
Universiade medalists in athletics (track and field)
Universiade bronze medalists for Ukraine
Medalists at the 2007 Summer Universiade
Olympic female sprinters
People from Kolomyia
Sportspeople from Ivano-Frankivsk Oblast